The Woronora River is a perennial river of the Sydney Basin, located in the Sutherland Shire local government area of Greater Metropolitan Sydney, approximately  south of the Sydney central business district, in New South Wales, Australia.

'Woronora' is an Aboriginal place name. Records show the spelling of the name has varied since it first appeared in the 19th century, the earliest being Wooloonora (Dixon, 1827, quoted in Walker 1974:66, followed by Wolonora (Dixon, 1837, and Woronora Mitchell, 1835). The name was first applied to the Woronora River, a tributary of the Georges River, before being given to an electoral district, a local road east of the river, and finally the suburb itself.

The Woronora River rises on the northwestern slopes of the Illawarra escarpment and has its origin from Waratah Rivulet, near Darkes Forest, and flows generally north for approximately 36 kilometres (22 mi), joined by three minor tributaries, before reaching its confluence with the Georges River, between Como and Illawong.

Location and features
Much of the course of the river is through the Dharawal State Conservation Area, Heathcote National Park and the Royal National Park as it descends  from source to mouth.

The river is impounded by the Woronora Dam, opened in 1941. The  impoundment is Lake Woronora, formed to augment water supply for southern Sydney and the northern Illawarra region.

The Woronora River is traversed by high level and low level road bridges and a footbridge in the suburb of Woronora. A road bridge on Heathcote Road, linking Heathcote and Holsworthy also provides a crossing over the river.
Comment from an ex resident: "The Needles" were considered the "head of navigation" where there was relatively deep water with pointed vertical rocks, mostly just below the surface, hence the name. There was a causeway there which was part of "The Old Illawarra Rd". This area is below the Heathcote Rd bridge by about 3/4 km. Just above this road bridge was "Woronora Wier" which was demolished in the mid 1900s for safety reasons.

Etymology
In the Australian Aboriginal Dharug language the river draws its name, meaning "black rocks". 'Woronora' is an Aboriginal place name. Records show the spelling of the name has varied since it first appeared in the 19th century, the earliest being Wooloonora (Dixon, 1827, quoted in Walker 1974:66, followed by Wolonora (Dixon, 1837, and Woronora Mitchell, 1835). The name was first applied to the Woronora River, a tributary of the Georges River, before being given to an electoral district, a local road east of the river, and finally the suburb itself.

Gallery

See also 

 List of rivers of New South Wales (L–Z)
 Rivers of New South Wales

References

Further reading

External links
 
 Woronora River Stormwater Management Plan, commissioned by Sutherland Shire Council, September 2000.
 Woronora River Floodplain Management Study, commissioned by Sutherland Shire Council, September 1995.
 The Woronora River at "The Great Kai'mia Way"
 Map of Woronora River, NSW at Bonzle Digital Atlas of Australia.
  [CC-By-SA]
 Guide to Sydney Rivers site

 

Rivers of Sydney
Sutherland Shire
Georges River